Graneledone is a genus of octopuses in the family Octopodidae. The type species is Eledone verrucosa Verrill, 1881.

Species
Species and subspecies within the genus Graneledone include:

 Graneledone antarctica Voss, 1976
 Graneledone boreopacifica Nesis, 1982
 Graneledone challengeri (Berry, 1916)
 Graneledone gonzalezi Guerra, González & Cherel, 2000
 Graneledone kubodera O'Shea, 1999
 Graneledone macrotyla Voss, 1976
 Graneledone taniwha O'Shea, 1999
 Graneledone taniwha kubodera
 Graneledone taniwha taniwha
 Graneledone verrucosa (A. E. Verrill, 1881)
 Graneledone verrucosa media *
 Graneledone verrucosa verrucosa
 Graneledone yamana Guerrero-Kommritz, 2000

Synonyms:
 Graneledone pacifica Voss & Pearcy, 1990: synonym of Graneledone boreopacifica Nesis, 1982
 Graneledone polymorpha Robson, 1930: synonym of Adelieledone polymorpha (Robson, 1930) (original combination)
 Graneledone setebos Robson, 1932: synonym of Megaleledone setebos (Robson, 1932) (original combination)

The species listed above with an asterisk (*) are questionable and need further study to determine if they are valid species or synonyms.

References

External links

 

Octopodidae
Cephalopod genera